Iosu Goñi Leoz (born 4 January 1990) is a Spanish handball player for Chambéry Savoie Mont-Blanc Handball and the Spanish team.

He participated at the 2017 World Men's Handball Championship.

References

External links

1990 births
Living people
Sportspeople from Pamplona
Spanish male handball players
CB Ademar León players
Liga ASOBAL players
Expatriate handball players
Spanish expatriate sportspeople in France
Mediterranean Games bronze medalists for Spain
Mediterranean Games medalists in handball
Competitors at the 2018 Mediterranean Games
Handball players from Navarre